Dmitri Igorevich Pivovarov (born 21 March 2000) is a Russian football player who plays for FC Krasnodar and FC Krasnodar-2.

Club career
He made his debut in the Russian Football National League for FC Krasnodar-2 on 17 July 2021 in a game against FC Alania Vladikavkaz.

He made his Russian Premier League debut for FC Krasnodar on 8 May 2022 against FC Arsenal Tula.

Career statistics

References

External links
 
 
 

2000 births
Sportspeople from Krasnoyarsk
Living people
Russian footballers
Association football defenders
FC Krasnodar-2 players
FC Krasnodar players
Russian Second League players
Russian First League players
Russian Premier League players